The Singles Table is an American comedy series created by Bill Martin and Mike Schiff that was intended to air on NBC during the 2006-07 television season.

It is notable as being one of few series that was canceled before airing a single episode.

Summary 
Because of their relationship status and relationships with the bride and groom, five strangers meet at Table 18 - a table in a far corner of a wedding reception that is quickly labeled "the singles table". However, through the course of the event, each of them begin to question issues in their lives and vow to make things better. For richer or poorer, these five strangers will become good friends—and, in some cases, they may become more than that.

Cast 
 Alicia Silverstone as Georgia
 Conor Dubin as Eli
 Jarrad Paul as Adam
 John Cho as Ivan
 Rhea Seehorn as Stephanie

Production 
On February 9, 2006, NBC issued a pilot order for the series. On February 27, Adam Bernstein became attached to direct the pilot. The following day saw Jarrad Paul, Rhea Seehorn and Conor Dubin cast in the roles of Adam, Stephanie and Eli respectively. On March 9, Pascale Hutton was cast as Georgia. On March 15, casting was completed with John Cho being cast in the final role in the series, Ivan.

The series was picked up on May 11, for a thirteen-episode first season.

On May 26, it was reported that producers were recasting the role of Georgia. It was not until September 15 that Alicia Silverstone was cast as Hutton's replacement.

As a result of cost-cutting at NBC and assessing its mid-season needs, it was announced on November 6 that production had been shut down and that only six episodes of the thirteen ordered had been completed.

There were plans to air the series during the summer of 2007, but those plans were subsequently scrapped and as of now, the series remains unaired.

Episodes

See also
 List of television series canceled before airing an episode

References

External links 
 

Unaired television shows